St. Louie may refer to:

 St. Louis, a city in the United States
 "St. Louie", a song by Nelly from his 2000 album Country Grammar